Miss Plus America  is a beauty pageant for plus-sized women. It began in 2002, to offer an alternative to mainstream pageants like Miss America, to which it has no affiliation.

All American women are eligible, so long as they are more than a size 14W.

References
2. https://www.ksat.com/news/local/2020/12/21/miss-plus-san-antonio-wins-miss-plus-texas-advances-to-nationals/

External links

 
 

Beauty pageants in the United States
American awards
Plus-size models